Vivian John Woodward (3 June 1879 – 31 January 1954) was an English footballer who enjoyed the peak of his career from the turn of the 20th century to the outbreak of the First World War. He played for Tottenham Hotspur and Chelsea.

He captained Great Britain to gold medals at the 1908 Olympics in London and in Stockholm in 1912. Woodward's tally of 29 goals in 23 matches for England remained a record from 1911 to 1958; his strike rate of 1.26 goals per game is the second highest for an England player.

He served in the British Army during the First World War, and as a result missed out on Chelsea's run to their first-ever FA Cup final in 1915. Woodward's injuries during the war caused his retirement from football.

Club career 
An architect by profession, Woodward began his career at Clacton Town. Following spells at Harwich & Parkeston and Chelmsford, he joined Tottenham Hotspur in 1901, who that year would win the FA Cup. Due to work and cricket commitments, he wouldn't begin to appear regularly for the team until the 1902–03 season. In nine seasons at White Hart Lane, he made 169 appearances and scored 73 goals.  Tottenham was elected to the Second Division of the Football League for the 1908–09 season, and Woodward scored Spurs' first ever goal in the Football League in September 1908 against Wolverhampton Wanderers that finished 3–0. He helped the team win promotion to the First Division that season.

Before the start of the 1909 season, Woodward decided to retire to concentrate on his architectural practice and cricket. He had a short spell back with Chelmsford, but was persuaded to join David Calderhead's Chelsea on 20 November 1909. He went on to play in a total of 116 games for them, scoring 34 goals. He was their leading scorer in the 1912–13 season with ten goals.

At the start of the First World War he enlisted in the British Army and as a result did not play many matches during the 1914–15 season, but he was given special leave to join Chelsea at Old Trafford for the Cup Final when Bob Thomson was injured. However Thomson recovered and Woodward refused to play and deny Thomson his chance to play in an FA Cup final as Woodward had not played in any of Chelsea's matches in their run to the final.

Woodward was injured in the right thigh during the war and did not return to top class football.

International career 
He made his England debut in 1903, scoring twice in a 4–0 win against Ireland. Between 1903 and 1911, he won 23 full caps and scored 29 goals, setting an English record that would last until the 1950s. He also played in three unofficial international matches against South Africa in 1910, scoring a further four goals. At the time, England only usually played three matches a season, for the British Home Championship, but two tours to central Europe in 1908 and 1909 netted Woodward 15 goals (over half his total). He held the overall England goalscoring record, either jointly or alone, for 47 years – longer than any other player until surpassed by Tom Finney in 1958. With his 28th and 29th goals, the last of his career, he overhauled Steve Bloomer against Wales in March 1911, and was not himself overtaken until Tom Finney scored his 30th (and last) goal in October 1958.

He also turned out 44 times for England Amateurs and scored 57 goals, most of them against inferior European teams. In one match against France in 1906, the Times and Sporting Life credit Woodward with eight goals in a 15–0 win, although FIFA's official record of the match credits him with only four goals. However he did score six against Netherlands in 1909. 30 of his amateur appearances and 44 goals were in matches recognized as full internationals by FIFA and the opposition's Football Associations, though not by the FA.

Woodward represented the Football League XI and the Southern League XI. He also toured the United States with The Pilgrims in 1905.

Olympic career 
Woodward was Great Britain captain at the 1908 and 1912 Olympic Games, both of which Great Britain won.

Military career 
He joined the 17th Battalion of the Middlesex Regiment. This was one of the Pals battalion formed during the early stages of World War I. It was known as a "Footballers Battalion" and it included many members of Woodward's former team Tottenham Hotspur. He served on the Western Front and was wounded in 1916. He attained the rank of Captain.

Career statistics

Club

International goals 
Sources:

Scores and results of England is listed first and score column indicates the score after each Woodward goal.

See also 
 List of men's footballers with 50 or more international goals

References

Further reading

External links 
 Vivian Woodward's appearances and goals for England and England Amateurs—from RSSSF
 
 

1879 births
Footballers from Lambeth
1954 deaths
English footballers
England international footballers
England amateur international footballers
Association football forwards
English Football League players
Chelsea F.C. players
Tottenham Hotspur F.C. players
Footballers at the 1908 Summer Olympics
Footballers at the 1912 Summer Olympics
English Olympic medallists
Olympic gold medallists for Great Britain
Olympic footballers of Great Britain
Middlesex Regiment officers
British Army personnel of World War I
Olympic medalists in football
English Football League representative players
F.C. Clacton players
Medalists at the 1912 Summer Olympics
Medalists at the 1908 Summer Olympics
Southern Football League representative players
Harwich & Parkeston F.C. players
Chelmsford City F.C. players
Pilgrims F.C. players
Military personnel from Surrey